Teucrium polium, known popularly as felty germander, is a sub-shrub and herb native to the western Mediterranean region (Albania, North Macedonia, Spain, France, Algeria, Morocco, Tunisia). Its flowers are small and range from pink to white, and its leaves are used in cooking and for medicine.

Traditional medicine 
Teucrium polium is used for various supposed treatments in traditional medicine, although it has potential for causing liver toxicity.

References

polium
Herbs
Plants described in 1753
Medicinal plants
Taxa named by Carl Linnaeus
Flora of Algeria